Qarah Saqqal may refer to:
 Qarah Saqqal-e Sofla